Michael Caputo (born October 26, 1992) is an American football coach and former player. He played college football at Wisconsin and played in the NFL for the Los Angeles Rams. He was most recently working as the safeties coach for Utah State.

High school career

College recruiting

College career

2011–2014
Caputo attended the University of Wisconsin–Madison where he played safety for the Wisconsin Badgers football team from 2011 through 2015. He was a starter for three seasons, 2013–2015.

Caputo's freshman year he was a member of the scout team and received a redshirt. In 2012, he played in 13 games, and only recorded ten tackles.

For the 2013 season Caputo earned a starting spot at safety despite missing all of spring training after undergoing neck surgery. Caputo started 12 of 13 games. By the end of the season Caputo tallied 63 tackles which ranked 2nd on the entire team.

In the 2014 season Caputo led the team in tackles with 106 tackles and was a consensus 2nd team All-Big Ten pick as well being named 2nd team All-American by the Football Writers Association of America.

2015
In the off season Caputo was named team captain for the 2015 season. Prior to the season starting Caputo was named to numerous preseason award watchlists, including the Lott IMPACT Trophy, Bednarik Award, Bronko Nagurski Trophy and Jim Thorpe Award.

In the season opener against Alabama, on the third play of the game, Caputo went down hard while tackling runningback Derrick Henry. After the play Caputo tried to join the Alabama huddle, shortly thereafter the referees called timeout and Caputo was later diagnosed with a concussion.

Caputo played in the 2016 East–West Shrine Game which was played at Tropicana Field in St. Petersburg, Florida. He recorded three tackles, two passes defensed and two interceptions. One of the interceptions was on former teammate Joel Stave which Caputo returned for 66 yards and was eventually tackled by Stave on the 11-yard line, preventing a pick six. After the game, Caputo was named the defensive MVP.

College statistics

source:

Professional career

Caputo is trained at Fischer Sports Institute in Phoenix, Arizona for the NFL Combine in February and Wisconsin's Pro Day in March, ultimately in preparation for the 2016 NFL draft. Caputo did not receive an invite to the NFL Combine and worked out at Wisconsin's Pro Day on March 9, 2016.

He was signed by the Los Angeles Rams on August 15, 2016. On August 30, 2016, Caputo was released by the Rams.

References

External links
Wisconsin Badgers bio

Living people
People from Allegheny County, Pennsylvania
American football safeties
Wisconsin Badgers football players
Los Angeles Rams players
1992 births
Sportspeople from the Pittsburgh metropolitan area